Here is the discography of American new wave band Blondie. Since 1976 they have released 11 studio albums, 4 live albums, 14 compilation albums, 3 remix albums, 3 EPs, and 38 singles. The band has sold an estimated 40 million albums.

Albums

Studio albums

* The band's debut album, Blondie, did not chart in the UK following its original release, but charted in March 1979 after it was re-released by Chrysalis Records.

Live albums

Compilation albums

Remix albums

Box sets

Extended plays

Singles

* "One Way or Another" was not released as a single in the UK, but charted from downloads in 2013 after a cover/mash-up of the song was released by One Direction and reached number one.

Digital downloads

Promotional singles

Billboard Year-End performances

Notes
 A^ "The Tide Is High" charted on the Billboard Adult Contemporary chart, reaching #3."Rapture" charted on both the R&B Songs and Mainstream Rock charts, reaching #33 and #35 respectively.The 1994 remix of "Rapture" charted on the Hot Dance Singles chart, reaching #35.The 1995 remixes of "Heart of Glass" and "Union City Blue" both charted on the Hot Dance Singles chart, peaking at #11 and #30 respectively."Maria" peaked at #14 on the Billboard Adult Top 40 chart and at #3 on the Hot Dance Singles chart.
 B^ "Heart of Glass" and "Island of Lost Souls" also both reached #1 on the RPM Adult Contemporary chart. "One Way or Another" and "Maria" reached #7 and #28 respectively on the same chart.
 C^ Christmas single made available for free download on Blondie's official website.
 D^ An outtake from the Panic of Girls sessions of 2011, posted on Deborah Harry's website as a free download including cover art and credits.
 E^ In 2012, the band released several tracks for free download via Amazon and on the band's website. "Bride of Infinity", "Dead Air" and "Rock On" were put online on October 10, in order to coincide with the band's performance on YouTube Presents, while "Practice Makes Perfect" was released in November.
 F^ "Kidnapper" is a Japanese-only release; "Heroes" (also released as a B-side to the "Atomic" single) is a German 12-inch maxi-only release; "Heart of Glass '88" is an Australian- and French-only release.
 G^ "Long Time" also reached #19 on the US Adult Alternative Songs chart.

Other appearances

Notes
 A^ Released under the name "Adolph's Dog".
 B^ Recorded and released to promote The New Cars and Blondie's Road Rage Tour.

Video

Video albums

Notes:
† Live at CBGB's 1977 was released as a bonus DVD in the deluxe edition of Blondie 4(0) Ever, which includes Greatest Hits Deluxe Redux and Ghosts of Download, the band's 10th studio album.

Music videos

References

Discographies of American artists
Rock music group discographies
Pop music group discographies
New wave discographies
Discography
Disco discographies